"Seek Bromance" is a single by Swedish producer and DJ Avicii, made while he was under the name Tim Berg (stylised as Tim/Berg) and is also his second released single. It was released on 17 October 2010 in the United Kingdom, where it charted at number 12. Earlier that year, on April 14, Avicii released an instrumental song named "Bromance", which topped the Flemish charts, and peaked at number two in the Netherlands. "Seek Bromance" is a vocal version of this song, with the addition of vocals from the track "Love U Seek" by Italian DJ Samuele Sartini featuring English singer Amanda Wilson, who, in the case of "Seek Bromance", is not credited as singer.

Composition
"Seek Bromance" is set in common time with a tempo of 126 beats per minute.

Track listing

Personnel
From liner notes:
Songwriting: Tim Bergling, Arash Pournouri, Maurizio Colella, Samuele Sartini, Maurizio Alfieri, Davide Domenella, Wendy Lewis, Andrea Tonici, Amanda Wilson, Massimiliano Moroldo
Production: Tim Bergling
Mixing: Tim Bergling, Arash Pournouri
Executive producer: Arash Pournouri
Vocal production and programming: Wez Clarke
Additional vocal recording and production: Tom Kent

Music video
The music video was filmed in California and showcases a road trip with two guys and a girl.

Charts and certifications

Weekly charts

Notes
The version that charted in Belgium and the Netherlands was the original instrumental as opposed to the vocal edit.

Year-end charts

Certifications

Release history

References

2010 singles
Mashup songs
2010 songs
Songs written by Avicii
Ministry of Sound singles
Avicii songs
Song recordings produced by Avicii
Songs written by Arash Pournouri